Drillia annielonae is a species of sea snail, a marine gastropod mollusc in the family Drilliidae.

Distribution
This marine species occurs off West Africa.

References

annielonae
Gastropods described in 2007
Molluscs of the Atlantic Ocean